Wolfe Tones GAC - Greencastle is a GAA club in Greencastle, County Antrim. They cater for men's and women's Gaelic football and play in the Co. Antrim Division 3 in both codes, and Antrim Junior Championship. The current manager is former Antrim Senior footballer Enda McAtamney.

History
Originally founded in 1931, the club fielded teams in Gaelic football, hurling and camogie for almost 40 years.

In the early 1970s the Catholic Church, which owned the grounds on which the club's playing pitch was situated, sold the land for the development of the M2 motorway. After a period of decline, the club folded shortly thereafter.

In 2019 the club was reestablished by young people in the area. They played their first competitive game in almost 50 years against St Patrick's GAC, Lisburn in September 2020.

In May 2021, Wolfe Tones launched their LGFA code, attracting over 100 women and girls in a short space of time. The LGFA section of the club now counts for 51% of the entire membership with LGFA teams across u6, u8, u10, u12, senior and G4MO groups.

References